Achromobacter spanius is a Gram-negative, oxidase- and catalase-positive, rod-shaped bacterium from the genus Achromobacter isolated from various human clinical samples.

References

External links
Type strain of Achromobacter spanius at BacDive -  the Bacterial Diversity Metadatabase

Burkholderiales
Bacteria described in 2003